Mapania is a genus of plants in the family Cyperaceae. It contains around 60-70 species, distributed in tropical regions of Africa, India, southern China, Southeast Asia, New Guinea, Australia, Central America, northern South America, and various oceanic islands.

See also
 Mapania ferruginea

References

Cyperaceae
Cyperaceae genera
Taxonomy articles created by Polbot